Kétévi Adiklè Assamagan (born March 12, 1963) is an African American engineer and physicist at the Brookhaven National Laboratory. He was elected a Fellow of the American Physical Society in 2021. Assamagan founded the African School of Physics.

Early life and education 
Assamagan was born in Port-Gentil Gabon, and moved to Togo at the age of 4. He was an undergraduate student at the University of Lomé. After earning his Bachelor's degree in Physics and Chemistry he was awarded a scholarship from the African-American Institute to study in the United States, where he joined the Southern Illinois University. He eventually started a graduate studies at Ball State University. His Master's research involved the development of a two-dimensional analytical model of a solar concentrator. After earning his Master's degree, he moved to the University of Virginia, where he worked toward a doctorate in particle physics. During his doctorate he worked at the Paul Scherrer Institute.

Research and career 
Assamagan was appointed to Hampton University where he worked on the Continuous Electron Beam Accelerator Facility. He eventually moved to the ATLAS experiment in CERN. His research considers physics beyond the Standard Model.  He moved to Brookhaven National Laboratory in 200, where he worked on the physics analysis tools for ATLAS. He was made coordinator for the software of the Muon Spectrometer. He was part of the ATLAS Collaboration when they first observed the Higgs boson in 2012.

Assamagan is co-founder of the African School of Physics, a non-profit school training African researchers in fundamental physics and applications. In 2019, he co-funded with Fairouz Malek, Simon Connel and others, the African Stratgey for Fundamental Physics. He was elected to the African Academy of Sciences in 2019 and the American Physical Society in 2021.

Selected publications

Personal life 
Assamagan plays African drums.

References 

1963 births
African-American engineers
African-American physicians
Fellows of the American Physical Society
20th-century African-American people
Living people
University of Lomé alumni